Enarthrocarpus pterocarpus is a species of plants in the family Brassicaceae.

Sources

References 

Flora of Malta
Brassicaceae